Mehkuyeh-ye Olya (also Romanized as Mehkūyeh-ye ‘Olyā; also known as Mehkūyeh-ye Bālā) is a village in Khvajehei Rural District, Meymand District, Firuzabad County, Fars Province, Iran. At the 2006 census, its population was 78, in 18 families.

References 

Populated places in Firuzabad County